Core77 is an online design magazine dedicated to the practice and produce of the field of industrial design.  It serves as a resource for students, practitioners and fans of the field, as well as a venue for essays and reports on the topic of design in general. Historically, most of the magazine's content has been produced by volunteer contributors.

The site began as the graduate thesis of Stuart Constantine and Eric Ludlum in their final year at Brooklyn, New York's Pratt Institute.  The site was launched in March 1995 and has been updated on a monthly basis since. It was first hosted at Interport, an early ISP in New York City; later it moved to its own domain.

Core77's popularity as a general design destination for the public has grown in recent years, leading to references of the site in The New York Times, Fast Company, and PC Magazine. The site also hosts an annual Core77 Design Awards competition to reward excellence in the field of design.

References

External links
 Core77 Website

Design magazines
Industrial design
Magazines established in 1995
Magazines published in New York City
Online magazines published in the United States
Visual arts magazines published in the United States